The American Mission in Egypt is the name often given to the operations of the United Presbyterian Church of North America that began in Cairo in 1854. Americans journeyed to Egypt with the hope of converting Coptic Christians in Egypt to Protestantism.

Further reading
 B.L. Carter, "On Spreading the Gospel to Egyptians Sitting in Darkness: The Political Problems of Missionaries in Egypt in the 1930s," Middle Eastern Studies, Vol. 20, No. 4 (Oct., 1984), 18–36.
 Heather J. Sharkey, "Empire and Muslim Conversion: Historical Reflections on Christian Missions in Egypt," Islam and Christian-Muslim Relations, Vol. 16, no. 1, 45–6.
 Heather J. Sharkey, American Evangelicals in Egypt, (2008)

References

Presbyterian organizations established in the 19th century